Ribo ou le soleil sauvage is a film shot in Cameroon in 1976. A Canadian-Cameroonian co-production, it was released in both countries in 1978.

Story 

In the African jungle, in ancient times, Ribo-a-Irep, the daughter of Irep, is a teenager girl living in a village of gatherers. She was promised to Dik-a-Gan, the son of Gan, chief of the neighboring village of dancers, while still inside her mother's belly. While the betrothed await their upcoming marriage, Teter-a-Mum, chief of a third village, a village of warriors, wants to make Ribo his new wife, one who would finally give him a child. With the help of his guards he has Ribo kidnapped. War follows, leading to the destruction of the village of gatherers. Thanks to an alliance between the gatherers and the dancers, Ribo is saved and the marriage between Ribo and Dik-a-Gan is joyously celebrated.

Production 
This film was shot in Cameroon, using amateur actors. Subsequently, however, Daniel Ndo became known for a long career as a humorist thanks to his role as Uncle Otsama. Suzanne Bandolo, who played Ribo, changed her name to Suzanne Bomback when she got married, and went into politics, eventually serving as Minister for the Promotion of Women and the Family.

Technical details 
 Director: Roger Racine CSC and Joseph-Henri Nama
 Director of photography: Roger Racine CSC
 Cameraman: Christian Racine
 Sound engineer, audio mixing: Gilbert Ferron and Jean Tsang
 Editor: Camil Adam, Alain Goudreau
Assistant Editor: Olivier Adam
 Production: Cinéfilms Montréal
 Distribution: Cinefilms & vidéo productions inc.
 Countries of origin: Canada and Cameroon
 Format: Techniscope 2.33
 Genre: Drama
 Duration: 95 minutes

Cast 
 Daniel Ndo:  Teter-a-Mum
 Suzanne Bandolo : Ribo-A-Irep
 Dieudonné Ond Ond : Dik-a-Gan
 Innocent Manda : Gan
 Paul Etoundi Mama : Irep
 Valentin Elandi : Zok

French voices 
 Med Hondo: Teter-a-Mum
 Marie Christine Darah: Ribo-A-Irep
 Tola Koukoui: Dik-a-Gan
 Pierre Saintons: Gan
 Daniel Kamwa: Irep

References

External links 
 
 Ribo ou le soleil sauvage trailer

Cameroonian drama films
Canadian drama films
Films set in Cameroon
Films set in pre-colonial sub-Saharan Africa
1978 films
French-language Canadian films
1978 drama films
Black Canadian films
1970s Canadian films